The 2017–18 season was Veres Rivne's 4th season in the top Ukrainian football league. Veres competed in Premier League and Ukrainian Cup. Despite finishing in third place in 2016–17 Ukrainian First League club was promoted after the controversial decision of the Ukrainian Premier League which denied Desna Chernihiv who finished in second place a licence to participate in the league, indicating that the club was not able to guarantee for an adequate financing of their infrastructure.

Players

Squad information

Transfers

In

Out

Pre-season and friendlies

Competitions

Overall

Premier League

League table

Results summary

Results by round

Matches

Ukrainian Cup

Statistics

Appearances and goals

|-
! colspan=14 style=background:#dcdcdc; text-align:center| Goalkeepers

|-
! colspan=14 style=background:#dcdcdc; text-align:center| Defenders

|-
! colspan=14 style=background:#dcdcdc; text-align:center| Midfielders 

|-
! colspan=14 style=background:#dcdcdc; text-align:center| Forwards

|-
! colspan=14 style=background:#dcdcdc; text-align:center| Players transferred out during the season

Last updated: 20 May 2018

Goalscorers

Last updated: 20 May 2018

Clean sheets

Last updated: 20 May 2017

Disciplinary record

Last updated: 20 May 2018

References

External links 
Official website

Veres Rivne
NK Veres Rivne